General elections are scheduled to be held in Indonesia on 14 February 2024 to elect the President, Vice President, People's Consultative Assembly (MPR) which consists of the DPR and the DPD, and members of local legislative bodies.

Electoral system
The previous election was regulated by Law No. 7 of 2017. The General Elections Commission (KPU), a legally independent government body was responsible for organizing the election. In addition, the vote was monitored by the General Election Supervisory Agency (Bawaslu), which also had the authority to rule on violations of election rules (e.g. administrative errors, vote-buying, etc.). Any ethical violations committed by either Bawaslu or the KPU were to be handled by the Elections Organizer Honor Council (Dewan Kehormatan Penyelenggara Pemilu DKPP), which consists of one member from each body and five others recommended by the government. The same system and regulations are expected to be applied in the 2024 edition.

Depending on the voting location and voters' domicile, voters will be given four or five ballot papers: one for the presidential candidates and their running mate, one for Regional Representative Council (DPD), one for People's Representative Council (DPR), one for provincial council, and for the regions outside of Jakarta Special Capital Region, there is one additional ballot paper reserved for regency/city council (DPRD Provinsi and DPRD Kabupaten/Kota) members election. Voters use a nail to poke a hole in the ballot paper indicating which party or candidate they wish to vote for, and then dip their fingers in ink as a precaution against voter fraud.

The voting age for the election is 17, or less if already married. Indonesians living overseas can vote in either the embassies and consulates, mobile polling stations, or by post.

Presidential
In order to run as a presidential candidate, a candidate must be formally endorsed by a political party or a coalition thereof which compose either 20 percent of seats in the DPR or 25 percent of popular votes in the prior election, i.e. in the 2019 election. Political parties are allowed to remain neutral if they are unable to propose their own candidate. However, if a neutral party(s) is able to endorse their own candidate, they are required to do so, or face being barred from participating in the next election.

The voting procedure followed a two-round system, with voters simply choosing one of the candidate pairs. A candidate will be required to win a majority and at least 20% of the votes in over half of Indonesia's provinces to be declared the winner. If no candidate pairs had fulfilled the criterion (50%+1 of total popular votes), the election will be repeated or progressed to a second round with only the two candidates receiving the most popular votes.

According to the Constitution, presidential candidates must:

Be at least 40 years old (the requirement has not changed);
Be resident in Indonesia for at least 5 years;
Not have foreign citizenship or residence permit in a foreign country, either at the time of the election or at any time before (new constitutional requirement).

Legislative
Members of both the People's Representative Council (DPR) and the Regional People's Representative Councils (DPRD) are elected from multi-member electoral districts through voting with an open list system, and seat distribution is done with the Sainte-Laguë method. There is a gender quota requiring at least 30% of registered candidates to be female.

A 4% parliamentary threshold is set for parties to be represented in the DPR, though candidates could still win seats in the regional councils provided they won sufficient votes. There are 580 DPR seats contested. Nationally, there are 84 DPR electoral districts, with 301 provincial and 2,375 municipal electoral districts. Senatorial candidates for the DPD are not allowed to be members of any political party. Four senators are elected for each province – a total of 152 members.

This will be the first elections for provincial deputies and senators of both Houses for Central, Southwest, South and Highland Papua - all new provinces formed in 2022. On 12 December 2022, Government Regulation in Lieu of Law No. 1/2022 signed and published to amend the 2017 electoral law to make the new electoral regions to those provinces and facilitate the election there. 

Nusantara, the designated new national capital, is expected to not to be developed as new separate electoral region in the 2024 general election. Proposed plans by the government is currently not focused on the establishment of new electoral region and districts in Nusantara due to its under-construction state and currently as there are few people currently living in Nusantara, less than the standard number of people to be established as a new electoral district. Due to this, a new temporary mechanism is currently devised by the government for DPR to serve as the temporary representation body until 2029, when Nusantara can be deemed capable to be established as new electoral region. For 2024 election, electors living within Nusantara are considered a part of the East Kalimantan electoral region and thus the regional representatives to the DPR that covers the area, as well as the provincial senators at large, will be elected.

Contesting parties 

A total of 24 political parties registered with the KPU to run in the election. On 14 December 2022, the KPU announced that 17 parties had passed the factual verification process and would be eligible to contest the legislative election. 

The Ummah Party, who the KPU deemed not qualified to participate in the 2024 Elections, accused the KPU of irregularities in the process. The party subsequently filed a written complaint. Following mediations brokered by General Election Supervisory Agency (Bawaslu) between the party and the KPU on 20 and 21 December, Bawaslu instructed the electoral commission to repeat the verification process for Ummah Party. The party declared as qualified to participate in the election on December 30.

Presidential election 
In July 2017, the People's Representative Council (DPR) passed a law that only parties or coalitions with at least 20% of seats in the legislature, or 25% of votes in the previous election are eligible to submit a presidential candidate. Requirements for presidential/vice-presidential candidates are, Indonesian-born citizens, Indonesian citizens who were born abroad, a minimum age of 40 and a requirement to "have a belief in the One and Only God". If the candidates had spouses, they also had to be Indonesian citizens. A criminal record resulting in over five years of incarceration or an active bankruptcy bars a candidate from running.

Declared candidates

Potential candidates
 Ganjar Pranowo, Governor of Central Java.
 Ridwan Kamil, Governor of West Java. 
 Puan Maharani, Speaker of the House of Representatives.
 Airlangga Hartarto, Coordinating Minister for Economic Affairs and Leader of Golkar.

Legislative election 
All legislative candidates has to be Indonesian citizens, over 21 years old, senior high school (or equivalent) graduates, and have never been convicted for a crime resulting in a sentence of 5 years or more. In addition, the candidates for the People's Representative Council (DPR) or local legislatures has to be endorsed by a political party and are required to resign from their non-legislative government offices – except for the president and vice president – or their state-owned company positions. Legislators running for reelection or another body through a new political party are also required to resign.

Opinion polls

President

People's Consultative Assembly

References

General
Indonesia
Presidential elections in Indonesia
Legislative elections in Indonesia